Hexter is a surname. Notable people with the surname include:

J. H. Hexter (1910–1996), American historian
Ralph Hexter (born 1952), American academic

See also
Dexter (name)
Heeter